Bradford Field  is a private-use airport located  east of the central business district of Huntersville, a town in Mecklenburg County, North Carolina, United States. It is privately owned by W. O. & Cecil D. Bradford. It was opened in the late 1960s by the Bradford brothers at the request of a few private aircraft owners in the town of Huntersville. The original turf airport in Huntersville was little more than a fenced-in cow pasture located at one end of the Meacham farm south of Huntersville. A minor aircraft accident involving a Piper J-3 "Cub" and the subsequent FAA investigation led to the closing of Meacham field, and the forced relocation of the two aircraft hangared there.

Bradford Field initially operated with only two aircraft a Beechcraft Staggerwing biplane and the repaired Piper J-3 involved in the Meacham Field accident. There were no hangars, or refueling facilities. In the early 1970 a single row of aircraft hangars were added as well as a refueling station and a small 30x30 foot concrete building. The building housed a small lounge, restrooms and an office.

The airport continued to expand and by the late seventies had two rows of hangars and had close to 35 aircraft.

Facilities and aircraft 
For a 12-month period (date unknown), the airport had 9,400 general aviation aircraft operations, an average of 25 per day. There are 64 single-engine aircraft based at this airport.

References

External links

Airports in North Carolina
Buildings and structures in Mecklenburg County, North Carolina
Transportation in Mecklenburg County, North Carolina